Patrick "PJ" Jacobsen (born August 7, 1993 in Montgomery, New York State) is an American motorcycle racer. For most of the  season he raced in the Superbike World Championship aboard a Honda CBR1000RR before parting company with his Triple M team, being replaced for two races by Florian Marino.<ref>World Superbike: American PJ Jacobsen Splits With Triple M Honda roadracingworld.com, October 8, 2018. Retrieved 6 January 2019</ref>

Career

He was the 2006 champion of the USGPRU 125GP Championship, and has also competed in his homeland in the USGPRU 250GP Championship and AMA Pro Daytona Sportbike Championship, plus the Spanish 125GP Championship. 2012 was a fragmented season, but included two major race wins—the British Superstock 1000 race at Donington Park and the British Supersport Championship round at Assen. For 2013 he was signed to ride in the British Superbike Championship for Tyco Suzuki. Since 2014 he participates full-time in the Supersport World Championship, initially with the Kawasaki Intermoto Ponyexpres team. Since the 2015 Portuguese round, Jacobsen switched to the CORE" Motorsport Thailand on a Honda. In August 2015, in the Malaysian round, Jacobsen became the first American to take a pole position and a win in the Supersport World Championship.

Career statistics

Grand Prix motorcycle racing

By season

Races by year
(key) (Races in bold indicate pole position; races in italics indicate fastest lap)

Supersport World Championship

Races by year
(key) (Races in bold indicate pole position; races in italics indicate fastest lap)

Superbike World Championship
Races by year
(key) (Races in bold indicate pole position; races in italics'' indicate fastest lap)

References

External links
 Profile on MotoGP.com
 Profile on WorldSBK.com

American motorcycle racers
Living people
125cc World Championship riders
Supersport World Championship riders
British Superbike Championship riders
Superbike World Championship riders
1993 births